The Martin Down Enclosure is an archaeological site on Martin Down, near the village of Martin, in Hampshire, England. It is near the boundaries with Dorset and Wiltshire.

The site is a scheduled monument, and it is one of several archaeological features on Martin Down, such as Bokerley Dyke.

They have mostly been found on downland of central southern England, usually situated on hillsides. Other examples are on Harrow Hill and Thundersbarrow Hill, both in West Sussex, South Lodge in Wiltshire, and on Shearplace Hill in Dorset.

Description
There was excavation by Augustus Pitt Rivers from November 1895 to March 1896. He excavated all of the bank and ditch, and about half of the interior; the present earthwork is his reconstruction. It was concluded that the site is middle Bronze Age, with later Romano-British occupation. Finds from the excavation included worked flint, animal bone and pottery of the Bronze Age and Romano-British period.

Excavations by Pitt Rivers
Other sites on Cranborne Chase excavated by Pitt Rivers include the Rotherley Down Settlement, South Lodge Camp, Woodcutts Settlement and Wor Barrow.

References

Archaeological sites in Hampshire
Bronze Age sites in Hampshire
Scheduled monuments in Hampshire